Gabriel Barylli (born 31 May 1957) is an Austrian actor and film director. He has appeared in more than 40 films and television shows since 1981. He won the Silver St. George award for Best Actor for his role in A French Woman at the 19th Moscow International Film Festival.

Selected filmography
As actor
  (1981), as Kurt Gerber
  (1984, TV film), as Leonidas Tachezy
  (1984), as Michael Blank
  (1986, TV film), as Freddy Wolff
 Wohin und zurück 3 – Welcome in Vienna (1986, TV film), as Freddy Wolff
 Mit meinen heißen Tränen (1986, TV film), as Moritz von Schwind
 Franza (1987, TV film), as Martin
 Storms in May (1987, TV film), as Leopold Holzner
 The Distant Land (1987), as Otto
 Bread and Butter (1990), as Martin
 A French Woman (1995), as Mathias Behrens
  (1996), as Taxi driver
  (1998, TV film), as Georg Walch

As director
 Bread and Butter (1990)
  (1996)
  (1999)

References

External links

 

1957 births
Living people
Austrian male film actors
Austrian male television actors
Austrian film directors
Austrian television directors
Male actors from Vienna
20th-century Austrian male actors
21st-century Austrian male actors
Film directors from Vienna